V. Mahendrao was an Indian civil servant and administrator. He was the administrator of Mahe from  July 10, 1979, to April 14, 1980.

References 

 

Year of birth missing (living people)
Living people
Indian civil servants